The Scottish Built Ships database is a free-to-use record of over 35,000 ships built in Scotland. It was renamed from the "Clyde Built Ships" database when its scope was extended to cover the whole country's ship and boatbuilders.

With a standard format, the extent of information varies from ship to ship, and additional information is being continually added by a team of voluntary editors. The records can be easily searched from a search page.

External links
 Scottish built ships database 

Ships built in Scotland 
Online archives
Maritime history of Scotland
Ship databases
Online databases
Databases in Scotland
Shipbuilding in Scotland